Aill na Cronain (Cronan's cliff) is an inland west-facing limestone crag in The Burren in County Clare, Ireland.  It is popular with novice rock climbers due to the number of short single-pitch 10–20 metre rock climbing routes in the S to HS rock climbing grades.  It is beside the Aillwee Caves.

Rock climbing

The crag is accessed by a 10–minute walk northwards from the upper car-park of the Ailwee Cave attraction (see map below).  The crag is on private property but rock climbing has been allowed since the early 1970s, with the earliest recorded rock climbing routes dating from circa 1971.  The UKClimbing online logbook notes that: "Skull slab is probably one of the best VDiffs you'll find in the country".  Aill na Cronain is also listed in Ireland's Adventure Bucket List, which says that: "If you are just starting out [rock climbing], one of the best spots to visit is Aill na Cronain, just beside the Ailwee Cave".

In terms of layout, the centre of Aill na Cronain is the "Skull Buttress" which has a distinctive skull–appearance when viewed from a distance. Its "nose" contains the flat Skull Slab VD–grade climb.  The "East Side" face, and "Far East Side" face, lie to the north of Skull Buttress.  The "Butterfly" face, and the "Small Wall" face lie to its south.  While most routes are between S and HS, more challenging routes have been put up on the "Skull Buttress" such as Raven (E3 6a), Monkey Business (E2 5c), and Sunbane (E1 5c).

Aill na Cronain is in the County Clare townland of Ballycahill.  Just over 23 kilometers to the southwest of Aill na Cronain is the more advanced rock climbing limestone sea–cliff called Ailladie, which contains some of Ireland's most advanced rock climbs.

Climbing bibliography

See also

Ailladie, major rock climbing limestone sea-cliff in County Clare
Ballyryan, inland rock climbing limestone crag in County Clare, right beside Ailladie
Fair Head, major rock climbing dolerite mountain crag in County Antrim
Dalkey Quarry, major rock climbing granite quarry in Dublin

References

External links
 Irish climbing.ie Aill na Cronain Online Database
 UK climbing.com Aill na Cronain Online Database

Climbing areas of Ireland
Geography of County Clare
Tourist attractions in County Clare